Park Joo-ho (or  ; born 16 January 1987) is a South Korean football player who plays as a defender for Suwon FC. A versatile player, his primary position is left-back but he is also able play in midfield as a defensive or wide midfielder. As captain, he played for South Korea national under-20 football team in 2007 FIFA U-20 World Cup in Canada.

Early life
Park attended Kwangwoon Electronics Technical High School and Soongsil University. While at university, he gained the interest of notable local and Japanese top-flight clubs but was not offered a contract after medicals revealed a back injury.

Club career

Career in Japan
Park started his professional career by joining J2 League club Mito HollyHock in 2008 after recovering from his back injury. He advanced to the top division after his debut season, and won the 2009 J1 League and the 2010 J.League Cup with Kashima Antlers and Júbilo Iwata respectively.

Basel
On 25 June 2011, Swiss Super League club Basel announced that Park had signed a four-year contract with them. He joined Basel's first team for their 2011–12 season under head coach Thorsten Fink. To the beginning of their 2011–12 season season Park was member of the Basel team that won the 2011 Uhrencup, beating both Hertha Berlin 3–0 and West Ham United 2–1 to lead the table on goal difference above Young Boys. After playing in six test games, Park played his domestic league debut for the club in the away game in the Swissporarena on 20 August 2011 as Basel were defeated 1–3 by Luzern. Park soon established himself as Basel's first-choice left-back. 

Basel entered the 2011–12 UEFA Champions League in the group stage. On 7 December 2011, during the Champions League group C match at home in the St. Jakob-Park he helped Basel defeat Manchester United to make his team become the first Swiss club to advance to the knockout stage of a Champions League. Basel won the match 2–1, sending United out of the Champions league. He also contributed to the team's 1–0 first-leg victory over Bayern Munich in the round of 16 by stopping Arjen Robben successfully. However, the team suffered a 7–0 defeat in the second leg and, therefore, it was the German team who advanced to the next round. At the end of the 2011–12 season Park won the Double with his new club. They won the League Championship title with 20 points advantage. The team won the Swiss Cup, winning the final 4–2 in a penalty shootout against Luzern.

The following season, Basel had to rotate their players a lot because they played twenty European games, including Champions League qualifiers and Europa League matches. Park wasn't guaranteed a consistent position as a starter, but still got enough appearances. Basel had started in the 2012–13 UEFA Champions League in the qualifying rounds. But were knocked out of the competition by CFR Cluj in the play-off round. They then continued in the 2012–13 UEFA Europa League group stage. Ending the group in second position, Basel continued in the knockout phase. Missing the first leg due to a suspension, Park played the second leg of quarter-final matches against Tottenham Hotspur, whom they beat 4–1 on penalties after a 4–4 aggregate draw to progress to the semi-finals. In the semi-final Basel were being matched against the reigning UEFA Champions League holders Chelsea. Park played in the first leg, but Chelsea won both games advancing 5–2 on aggregate and eventually winning the competition.

Park scored his first goal for the club on 21 April 2013 in the away game at the Stockhorn Arena as Basel played a 2–2 draw with Thun. At the end of the Super League season 2012–13 he won his second Championship title with the team. In the 2012–13 Swiss Cup Basel reached the final, but were runners up behind Grasshopper Club, being defeated 4–3 on penalties, following a 1–1 draw after extra time.

On 17 July 2013 it was announced that Park was leaving the club. During his two season with them, Park played a total of 107 games for Basel scoring that one goal. 47 of these games were in the Swiss Super League, eight in the Swiss Cup, 22 in the UEFA competitions (Champions League and Europa League) and 30 were friendly games.

Mainz 05
On 17 July 2013, Mainz 05 announced the signing of Park on a full transfer from Basel. He signed a two-year contract through June 2015 with a club option for an additional two years. He played 27 matches as a left-back or a central midfielder for Mainz in the 2013–14 Bundesliga, and cooperated with them in qualifying for the Europa League. He was named in player rankings of football magazine kicker after the end of the season.

Borussia Dortmund
Park moved to Borussia Dortmund, following Thomas Tuchel who coached him in Mainz. On 17 September 2015, he played his first match for Dortmund in a Europa League match against Krasnodar, and led Dortmund to a 2–1 win by having a goal and an assist. Afterwards, however, he spent much time on Dortmund's bench during two seasons.

Furthermore, Park was sent to the club's reserve team by new manager Peter Bosz at the beginning of the 2017–18 season. Park finally left Dortmund on 3 December 2017.

Ulsan Hyundai
Park signed a four-year contract with Ulsan Hyundai on 18 December 2017. He was appointed a vice-captain ahead of his second season with Ulsan. He conceded a goal by mistake in the 2020 AFC Champions League Final, but won the Champions League title. He decided not to see out his contract as new incoming manager Hong Myung-bo could not guarantee him playing time.

Suwon FC
On 27 January 2021, it was announced that Park had signed with Suwon FC, which had just been promoted to the top flight.

International career
Park captained South Korean under-20 team in the 2007 FIFA U-20 World Cup.

On 18 January 2010, Park made his first international cap for South Korea in a friendly against Finland.

On 28 May 2014, Park was selected for the South Korean squad for the 2014 FIFA World Cup to replace injured player Kim Jin-su. However, he didn't play any matches while South Korea finished at the bottom of their group.

Park was one of the three over-aged players in South Korea's squad for the 2014 Asian Games, and played in a defensive midfield position as Kim Jin-su preferred playing as a left back. He scored in the round of 16 match against Hong Kong. He played all matches as starter, and became a gold medalist. His gold medal allowed him to be exempted from the two-year mandatory military service and continue his career in the Bundesliga.

Park also played as a defensive midfielder and Ki Sung-yueng's partner in the 2015 AFC Asian Cup, helping South Korea advance to the Asian Cup final for the first time in 27 years.

Park was going to participate as a main player in the 2018 FIFA World Cup. However, he sustained a thigh injury during the first match against Sweden and was ruled out for the rest of the tournament.

On 16 October 2018, Park scored his first senior international goal against Panama.

Personal life
Park met his Swiss wife Anna while playing for Basel, where she was working at the stadium cafe. They have three children, daughter Eden/Na-eun (born in 2015), and sons Aciel/Gun-hoo (born in 2017) and Élyséen/Jin-woo (born in 2020). After previously keeping his family out of the spotlight, Park and their oldest two children joined the cast of The Return of Superman in 2018.

Career statistics

Club

International

Scores and results list South Korea's goal tally first.

Honours

Player
Kashima Antlers
J1 League: 2009

Júbilo Iwata
J.League Cup: 2010

Basel
Swiss Super League: 2011–12, 2012–13
Swiss Cup: 2011–12

Borussia Dortmund
DFB-Pokal: 2016–17

Ulsan Hyundai
AFC Champions League: 2020

South Korea U23
Asian Games: 2014

South Korea
AFC Asian Cup runner-up: 2015
EAFF Championship: 2019

Entertainer

Notes

References

External links
 Park Joo-ho – National Team Stats at KFA 
 
 
 

 Park Joo-ho at Asian Games Incheon 2014

1987 births
Living people
Footballers from Seoul
Association football midfielders
South Korean footballers
South Korea under-20 international footballers
South Korea under-23 international footballers
South Korea international footballers
South Korean expatriate footballers
Mito HollyHock players
Kashima Antlers players
Júbilo Iwata players
FC Basel players
1. FSV Mainz 05 players
Borussia Dortmund players
Borussia Dortmund II players
Ulsan Hyundai FC players
J1 League players
J2 League players
Swiss Super League players
Bundesliga players
Regionalliga players
K League 1 players
Expatriate footballers in Japan
South Korean expatriate sportspeople in Japan
Expatriate footballers in Switzerland
South Korean expatriate sportspeople in Switzerland
Expatriate footballers in Germany
South Korean expatriate sportspeople in Germany
2014 FIFA World Cup players
Footballers at the 2014 Asian Games
2015 AFC Asian Cup players
Asian Games medalists in football
Asian Games gold medalists for South Korea
Medalists at the 2014 Asian Games
2018 FIFA World Cup players